T. indica may refer to:
 Tamarindus indica, the imli or tamarind, a tree species
 Tarucus indica, the Indian Pierrot, a small butterfly species found in India of the lycaenids or blues family
 Tatera indica, the Indian gerbil, a rodent species found in Afghanistan, India, Iran, Iraq and Kuwait
Tecticornia indica, a species of succulent plant in the amaranth family
 Tilakiella indica, the single species in the monotypic genus Tilakiella
 Tilletia indica, the Karnal bunt, a smut fungus species
 Tinissa indica, a species of fungus moth
 Treatia indica, a species of mite
 Tricolia indica, a species of pheasant snail
 Tringa indica, the red-wattled lapwing, a bird species
 Trypeta indica, a fruit fly species

Synonyms 
 Tabernaemontana indica, a synonym of Tabernaemontana pandacaqui, the windmill bush
 Tyrosinophaga indica, a synonym of Emticicia oligotrophica, a species of bacterium found in warm spring water

See also
 Indica (disambiguation)